Bob Bryan and Mike Bryan were the defending champions, but this year they decided not to participate. 
Americans James Blake and Sam Querrey won the tournament defeating Treat Conrad Huey and Dominic Inglot in the final by a score of 7–6(16–14), 6–4.

Seeds

Draw

Draw

External links
 Main draw

Doubles